Praveen Kumar  (born 21 December 1984) is an Indian politician and former member of the Sixth Legislative Assembly of Delhi. He is currently a sitting member of legislative assembly of Delhi. He is a member of the Aam Aadmi Party and represents Jangpura (Assembly constituency) of Delhi. Jangpura is an assembly seat in South Delhi region and South East district of Delhi and falls under South Delhi Municipal Corporation.

Allegation

Office of Profit
In March, 2017, a man named Vivek Garg had filed a petition before the President seeking disqualification of 11 AAP lawmakers, including state Transport Minister Kailash Gahlot, claiming that being co-chairpersons of district disaster management authorities in 11 Delhi districts, they were enjoying office of profit. The issue was referred to the Election Commission which gave an opinion in August that holding the office of co-chairperson of a district disaster management authority does not attract disqualification as MLA as there is no remuneration by way of salary, allowances, sitting fee. Nor is there any other facility such as staff car, office space, supporting staff, telephone or residence provided.

Petition against distributing oxygen to COVID-19 patients
On July 8, the drugs control department had filed complaints under the Drugs and Cosmetics Act before a Dwarka court against BJP MP Gautam Gambhir’s foundation and the two AAP MLAs. While allegations against the Gautam Gambhir Foundation (GGF) pertain to stocking and distribution of a Covid drug and medical oxygen, Kumar and Hussain were found to have stocked and distributed medical oxygen in contravention of law. The department gave a clean chit to Delhi BJP president Adesh Gupta and Leader of Opposition Ramvir Singh Bidhuri in a private complaint alleging unlawful distribution of medical oxygen by them.

A Bench of Justice Vipin Sanghi and Justice Jasmeet Singh said they could not permit prosecution of good Samaritans for helping society at a time when the authorities had failed to provide oxygen.

Posts Held

Electoral performance

See also

Sixth Legislative Assembly of Delhi
Delhi Legislative Assembly
Government of India
Politics of India
Aam Aadmi Party

References

External links
 Praveen Kumar's Website

Delhi MLAs 2015–2020
Delhi MLAs 2020–2025
Aam Aadmi Party politicians from Delhi
People from New Delhi
Living people
1984 births
Delhi politicians by party